Birchtown is a community and National Historic Site in the Canadian province of Nova Scotia, located near Shelburne in the Municipal District of Shelburne County.  Founded in 1783, the village was the largest settlement of Black Loyalists and the largest free settlement of ethnic Africans in North America in the eighteenth century. The two other significant Black Loyalist communities established in Nova Scotia were Brindley town and Tracadie. Birchtown was named after British Brigadier General Samuel Birch, an official who helped lead the evacuation of Black Loyalists from New York.{{efn|Also named after the general was a much smaller settlement of Black Loyalists in Guysborough County, Nova Scotia called Birchtown.

Birchtown was declared a National Historic Site in 1997. A seasonal museum complex commemorating the Black Loyalists was opened in that year by the Black Loyalist Heritage Society; it included the historic Birchtown school and church. The offices and archives of the museum were largely destroyed by an arson attack in 2006. The remaining archives were moved to temporary quarters on the site.

A new facility, the Black Loyalist Heritage Centre, opened its doors in June 2015; it tells the story of the Black Loyalists in America, Nova Scotia and Sierra Leone through their staff and interactive digital displays.

In literature
The community's history of being given freedom by the British was the subject to British historian Simon Schama's non-fiction book Rough Crossings, which won the National Book Critics Circle Award. Lawrence Hill wrote a novel, The Book of Negroes, whose fictional narrator, Aminata Diallo, resides in Birchtown and describes its founding.

Notable residents
Stephen Blucke - "founder of Afro-Nova Scotian community"
David George - African-American Baptist preacher who founded Silver Bluff Baptist Church
Boston King, first Methodist missionary to African indigenous people
John Marrant - the first African-American preacher; a Methodist
Moses Wilkinson - African- American Methodist preacher

See also
 List of communities in Nova Scotia
John Clarkson (abolitionist)
Sierra Leone Creole people

Notes

References

External links
 Clarkson, Clarkson's mission to America, 1791–1792, ed. and intro. C. B. Fergusson 
Birchtown, Destination Nova Scotia
The Black Loyalist Heritage Society
http://www.newsouthassoc.com/African%20American%20Archaeology%20Newsletters/Summer1994.html
https://web.archive.org/web/20080511234625/http://www.lawrencehill.com/freedom_bound.pdf
https://web.archive.org/web/20080311110229/http://nsgna.ednet.ns.ca/shelburne/main/BlackLoyalistHistory.php
https://web.archive.org/web/20071218192834/http://museum.gov.ns.ca/arch/sites/birch/loyalists.htm

Black Canadian settlements
Populated places established by African Americans
Pre-emancipation African-American history
General Service Areas in Nova Scotia
Communities in Shelburne County, Nova Scotia